Henri Manders (born 2 March 1960 in The Hague) is a Dutch former professional road bicycle racer.

Major results

1982
 1st Overall Tour of Greece
 1st Drielandenomloop
1983
 2nd Grand Prix Impanis-Van Petegem
 9th Grand Prix Cerami
1984
 5th La Flèche Wallonne
 6th Overall Ronde van Nederland
 9th Grand Prix de Wallonie
1985
 1st Circuit des Frontières
 1st Stage 5 Tour de France
 9th Dwars door België
 10th Grand Prix d'Isbergues
1986
 3rd Omloop van het Leiedal
 5th Kampioenschap van Vlaanderen
1987
 1st Stage 12 Herald Sun Tour
 9th Grand Prix Impanis-Van Petegem
1988
 7th Giro dell'Etna
 9th Omloop Het Volk
1989
 1st Stage 10 Herald Sun Tour
 6th Omloop van de Westhoek
 6th GP du canton d'Argovie
 6th De Kustpijl
1990
 3rd Road race, National Road Championships
 3rd Overall Étoile de Bessèges
1991
 7th Rund um Köln

Grand Tour general classification results timeline

External links 

Dutch male cyclists
1960 births
Living people
Dutch Tour de France stage winners
Cyclists from The Hague